Classic Hip-Hop is a 24-hour syndicated music format owned and operated by American radio production and distribution company Westwood One. Launched in 2015, the format features classic hip hop music from the 1980s, 1990s, and 2000s. It is targeted to adults ages 25–54, many of whom grew up listening to hip hop music as the genre developed and grew in popularity during this period.

History
Prior to the launch of Classic Hip-Hop on May 22, 2015, Westwood One operated a radio network originally known as "Old School Hip-Hop and R&B", which was later renamed "Classic Hip-Hop and R&B" and, finally, "The Rhythm". The most recent incarnation of the satellite-distributed format, however, is based directly on the now-defunct classic hip hop station WRWM (93.9 The Beat) in Indianapolis. (The station has since flipped to a mainstream rock format.) Classic Hip-Hop features primarily hip-hop songs from the 1980s, 1990s, and early 2000s but also includes contemporary R&B selections from the same period.

Core recording artists featured on Classic Hip-Hop include 2Pac, The Notorious B.I.G., Salt-N-Pepa, Snoop Dogg, Jodeci, Missy Elliott, and TLC.

Affiliates
This is a partial list.
Buffalo, New York — WBBF
Erie, Pennsylvania - WXKC-HD2 
Owensboro, Kentucky — WXCM-HD3

References

External links

American radio networks
Classic hip hop radio stations in the United States
Westwood One